An osmotic diuretic is a type of diuretic that inhibits reabsorption of water and sodium (Na). They are pharmacologically inert substances that are given intravenously. They increase the osmolarity of blood and renal filtrate.

Two examples are mannitol and isosorbide.

In the nephron, osmotic diuretics act at the portions of the nephron that are water-permeable.

Osmotic diuretics work by expanding extracellular fluid and plasma volume, therefore increasing blood flow to the kidney. This washes out the cortical medullary gradient in the kidney. This stops the loop of Henle from concentrating urine, which usually uses the high osmotic and solute gradient to transport solutes and water.

These agents can also act at other parts of the body. For example, they can be used to reduce intracranial and intra-ocular pressure. Osmotic diuretics increase plasma volume, but because they do not cross the blood-brain barrier, this does not affect the nervous system. In effect, this is the cause of their action reducing locally the plasma volume in the nervous system.

Mechanism of action 

Osmotic diuretics have their major effect in the proximal convoluted tubule and the descending limb of the Loop of Henle. These sites are freely permeable to water. Through osmotic effects, they also oppose the action of ADH in the collecting tubule. The presence of a nonreabsorbable solute such as mannitol prevents the normal absorption of water by interposing a countervailing osmotic force. As a result, urine volume increases.

The increase in urine flow rate decreases the contact time between fluid and the tubular epithelium, thus reducing sodium as well as water reabsorption. The resulting natriuresis is of lesser magnitude than the water diuresis, leading eventually to excessive water loss and hypernatremia.

Any osmotically active agent that is filtered by the glomerulus but not reabsorbed causes water to be retained in these segments and promotes a water diuresis. Such agents can be used to reduce intracranial pressure and to promote prompt removal of renal toxins. The prototypical osmotic diuretic is mannitol.

Mannitol lowers the intra cranial pressure through two effects in the brain. The first, rheological effect, reduces blood viscosity, and promotes plasma expansion and cerebral oxygen delivery. In response, cerebral vasoconstriction occurs due to autoregulation, and cerebral blood volume is decreased. The second effect occurs through creation of an osmotic gradient across the blood-brain barrier, leading to the movement of water from the parenchyma to the intravascular space. Brain tissue volume is decreased and, therefore, ICP is lowered.

See also
 Osmosis

References

External links